Ayllón is a surname. Notable people with the surname include:
Eva Ayllón, Peruvian composer and singer
Julio Garrett Ayllón
Lucas Vázquez de Ayllón (1475-1526), Spanish explorer of North America
Luis López de la Torre Ayllón y Kirsmacker, Spanish nobleman
Marcelino Pérez Ayllón
Rafaela Porras Ayllón, Spanish nun
Solomon Ayllon (1664-1728), haham of the Sephardic congregations in London and Amsterdam
Valentín Abecia Ayllón

See also

Aillón